Eades is an English surname. Notable people with this surname include:

 Gerald Eades Bentley (1901–1994), American academic
 Peter Eades (born 1952), Australian scientist
 Ryan Eades (born 1991), American baseball player
 Sandra Eades (born 1967), Australian physician
 Terry Eades (born 1944), Northern Irish footballer
 Thomas Eades Walker (1843–1899), British Conservative politician